David Joseph "Dai" Cornell (born 28 March 1991) is a Welsh professional footballer who plays as a goalkeeper for EFL Championship club Preston North End. He has represented the Wales under-21 team.

Club career

Swansea City
After progressing through Swansea City's Academy, Cornell was included in Swansea's senior squad for their 2008 pre-season tour of Spain. However the 17-year old's progress was halted when he suffered a serious wrist injury on tour. Later that season, Cornell was called up to the first team bench for Swansea's fifth round FA Cup match against Fulham after loan signing Dimitrios Konstantopoulos was unable to extend his stay at the club. Ten days later, Cornell was included again on Swansea's bench for the# FA Cup fifth round replay  against Fulham. After impressing manager Roberto Martínez, Cornell was installed as Dorus de Vries' understudy for the rest of the 2008–09 season but made no further appearances in Swansea's remaining matchday squads.

Cornell made his professional debut for Swansea on 25 August 2009 when he was named in the starting line-up for the League Cup match against Scunthorpe United. In February 2010, Cornell signed a new three-and-a-half year contract with Swansea to keep him at the club until July 2013. In the 2009–10 season, Cornell was included on the bench for 45 of Swansea's 46 Football League Championship games.

Following loan spells at Port Talbot Town and Hereford United, Cornell returned to Swansea for the 2012–13 season as third choice goalkeeper. In September 2012, Cornell signed a new three-year deal, keeping him at the club until July 2015. Due to injuries to Michel Vorm and Gerhard Tremmel, Cornell was included on the bench on 14 occasions for Swansea during the season.

On 28 May 2015, Swansea City confirmed that Cornell had been released from the club.

Port Talbot Town (loan)
In the 2010–11 season, Cornell fell down the pecking order at Swansea following the signing of Yves Ma-Kalambay as cover for Dorus de Vries and was loaned out to Welsh Premier League side Port Talbot Town during the second half of the season to gain first team experience. Cornell made 14 appearances for Port Talbot, keeping 5 clean sheets.

Hereford United (loan)
After Swansea's promotion to the Premier League, Cornell's opportunities were further limited. In August 2011 Football League Two side Hereford United signed Cornell on an initial one-month loan deal as cover for Adam Bartlett. After some impressive performances, Cornell's loan was extended by Hereford until the end of the 2011–12 season. Cornell made 27 appearances in all competitions for Hereford.

St Mirren (loan)
On 1 July 2013, Cornell joined St Mirren on a season-long loan. Cornell made 6 appearances in all competitions for St Mirren before his loan was cancelled in December 2013.

Portsmouth (loan)
On 17 March 2015, Cornell joined Portsmouth on a one-month loan deal. He did not make an appearance for the club before returning to Swansea in April.

Oldham Athletic
Following his release from Swansea City, Cornell joined League One team Oldham Athletic in July 2015 on a one-year contract with the option of an additional year extension. He made his debut against Middlesbrough in the League Cup on 12 August 2015. Cornell made 17 appearances for Oldham during the 2015–16 season.

Northampton Town
In June 2016, Cornell joined Northampton Town on a two-year contract. He made his debut for Northampton on 30 August 2016 against Wycombe Wanderers in the EFL Trophy. He featured as the second choice keeper during his first season at the club, behind first choice goalkeeper Adam Smith, making 10 appearances in all competitions with 6 of those being in the league.

He continued as second choice keeper for Northampton during the following season, making 12 appearances during the season as Northampton suffered relegation from League One. He was offered a new contract by Northampton at the end of the 2017–18 season, following their relegation.

Cornell became the first choice keeper at Northampton during the 2018–19 season. He started every league game for Northampton, making 48 appearances in total in all competitions.

He kept his place as the starting goalkeeper in the first-team the following season. He made 33 starts and 1 substitute appearance in the league, helping Northampton to a 7th-placed finish in League Two and qualification for the League Two play-offs as a result. Northampton won promotion to League One after defeating Exeter City 4–0 in the 2020 EFL League One play-off Final at Wembley Stadium. He was an unused substitute during the final. He made 38 appearances in total during the 2019–20 season. Cornell was released at the end of the 2019–2020 season after not receiving a new contract offer from the club.

Ipswich Town
On 17 August 2020, Cornell joined Ipswich Town on a free transfer, signing a two-year contract with the option of an additional year extension. He started his Ipswich career as second-choice keeper behind Tomáš Holý, appearing in cup competitions during the early months of the 2020–21 season, he played in all of Ipswich's EFL Trophy group stage matches, as well as in the EFL Cup and FA Cup. He made his first league appearance on 28 November, in a 0–2 loss to Charlton Athletic, before going on to make six consecutive league starts, his longest run in the team to date. He made a return to the first-team after over three months out in a 0–0 draw with AFC Wimbledon on 24 April, saving a penalty to keep a clean sheet.

On 11 June 2021, the club announced that Cornell had left the club by mutual consent with a year remaining on his contract, after being informed that he was no longer in the club's plans for next season. He departed having made 15 appearances for the Blues in all competitions, keeping four clean sheets.

Peterborough United
On 29 June 2021, Cornell joined Peterborough United on a free transfer, signing a two-year contract. He started his career in Peterborough as a reserve keeper behind Christy Pym. He made his Peterborough debut in the EFL Cup on 10 August 2021, in a 4–0 loss. After Christy Pym bust-up with the Peterborough United boss Darren Ferguson in a 3–1 loss to Reading on 14 September 2021, Pym has been excluded from the first-team picture. This allowed Cornell to take his place for this season. He made his Championship debut in a 3–0 win against Birmingham City.

Preston North End
On 27 June 2022, Cornell signed on a two-year deal for Championship team Preston North End on a free transfer, after the expiration of his contract with Peterborough United.

International career
Cornell made his debut for the Wales under-17 side on 25 March 2007, in a 3–0 defeat to Belarus, and went on to win five caps at under-17 level, his last coming on 6 October 2007 in a 2–2 draw with Spain in the qualifying round of the 2008 UEFA European Under-17 Football Championship. In August 2009, he received his first call-up to the Wales under-21 side to face Italy, but remained on the bench.

In November 2009, he made his debut for the Wales under-19 side, playing in consecutive defeats to Portugal and Spain in the qualifying round of the 2010 UEFA European Under-19 Football Championship. The day after, Cornell was handed a shock call-up to the Wales senior squad, for their friendly match against Scotland due to the playing commitments of Owain Fôn Williams, and Lewis Price, and an injury to Boaz Myhill. Cornell however was not included in the matchday squad.

Cornell made his debut for the Wales under-21 side on 18 May 2010 in a 1–0 defeat to Austria under-21s.

Cornell was called up to the Wales senior squad again in October 2010 for the UEFA Euro 2012 qualifying match against Switzerland. He was an unused substitute in a match that Wales lost 4–1.

Personal life
Cornell often goes by the name 'Dai', Welsh for David.

Career statistics

Honours
Northampton Town
EFL League Two play-offs: 2020

References

External links

1991 births
Living people
Footballers from Swansea
Welsh footballers
Wales youth international footballers
Wales under-21 international footballers
Association football goalkeepers
Swansea City A.F.C. players
Port Talbot Town F.C. players
Hereford United F.C. players
St Mirren F.C. players
Portsmouth F.C. players
Oldham Athletic A.F.C. players
Northampton Town F.C. players
Ipswich Town F.C. players
Peterborough United F.C. players
Preston North End F.C. players
Cymru Premier players
English Football League players
Scottish Professional Football League players